Clark is a 2022 Swedish six episode television drama series starring Bill Skarsgård, produced by Netflix, released on 5 May 2022. It is based on the life of Clark Olofsson and includes, in episode four, the events of the Norrmalmstorg robbery.

Cast and characters

Episodes

Soundtrack
Music for the series is composed by Mikael Åkerfeldt, the frontman of the Progressive/Metal band Opeth. Tobias Forge, the person behind Ghost plays a small part as a violinist in episode 6. Amalie Bruun, from Myrkur, plays the a member of the revolution group in episode 5.

Reception
Critical response was generally positive from critics. On Rotten Tomatoes, the miniseries has an approval rating of 78% from critics. 

Imogen West-Knights wrote a mixed review in The New Statesman, praising Skarsgård's performance in particular while being critical of the show's "breakneck pacing and tonal shifts," and not fully committing to its self-aware commentary.

References

External links
 

Swedish-language Netflix original programming